A budtender is a title of a staff member who works within a dispensary or store where medical or recreational cannabis is sold. Their job is to offer suggestions to customers, answer questions, handle products and showcase products being sold.

Origin 
According to Merriam-Webster, budtender is a portmanteau that combines the word bartender and bud. Like a bartender, budtenders serve customers within a licensed establishment while the word bud is referring to the dried flower tops of Cannabis used for consumption. It dates back to at least 1997, shortly after cannabis was legalized in California.

Qualifications 
The first budtenders gained knowledge through Cannabis farmers, extraction technicians, edible chefs and other cannabis experts. In the early days of legalized medical cannabis no prior schooling was needed to work as a budtender. As of 2017, no license or certification is needed to be a budtender. Because Cannabis is still illegal on a national level, no national licensing standards have been implemented. Most budtenders are self taught cannabis connoisseurs while some are trained formally. 
In Canada you are required to complete the CannSell course to be certified to work in a dispensary.

Careers

Experience and knowledge 

Budtenders have to be qualified to work in a dispensary and must have a wide range of cannabis knowledge. In order to provide customers with a positive experience at a dispensary, budtenders need to demonstrate their knowledge of strains, cannabis products and medical use. They need to know the characteristics of each strain of cannabis they sell, based on their taste, smell and effects. If a customer were to ask about a specific strain that the dispensary does not have, a budtender should be able to recommend a similar strain with their broad understanding of cannabis in terms of the attributes of the customer’s original request. A budtender should also be able to adhere to the necessity for a medical marijuana user. Their ability to understand the medical circumstances of certain strains is critical and essential for the safety of the customer. Budtenders may stay aware of cannabis trends by checking social media and industry blogs.

Customer service 
Since budtenders work one-on-one with customers, it is essential that they provide a welcoming environment for them. A budtender's job is to provide and share their knowledge of cannabis with a customer, have the ability to teach those who have never tried cannabis before and to provide insight to new trends or strains. Budtenders also sometimes share stories in order to market to a customer and also to create a friendlier environment. These stories are meant to provide apprehension of what a customer might feel or do when they use a certain type of cannabis. However, budtenders are not recommended to push their products by telling fake stories and experiences in order to get a customer to buy something; this is considered bad customer service within the industry. Also, budtenders are commended when they have good hygiene when addressing or working with customers. Having clean hands and tidy attire are critical when a budtender works with a customer. Budtenders are also recommended to use tongs or gloves when pulling out a sample from a jar instead of reaching in with their bare hands in states where this is allowed, as not all states allow for open containers of cannabis on the premises of dispensaries. Finally, budtenders are also highly recommended to express a sense of passion for their product in order to spark interest from a customer.

Income 
Because the distribution and use of marijuana is illegal on a federal level, budtending salaries vary per state. However as of 2022, the general hourly income for a budtender is $15 - $22, depending on level of experience. 

One of the perks of being a budtender is that many dispensaries give discounts of their product to their employees. Budtenders will often get tips from their customers, and sometimes a yearly salary (with tips) can be from $28,000-$42,000.

Legality 
In the United States, there are 15 states that have legalized recreational marijuana, and another 35 states that have made medical marijuana legal. Budtenders in these states are held to state legislation, and must comply with state law.

Oregon
Oregon, one of the 15 recreational marijuana states, is regulated by the Oregon Liquor Control Commission (OLCC), and require all budtenders to be at least 21 years or older to obtain a license and/or permit. Whether it be production or processing purposes, any budtender who actively handles marijuana, must have a permit to secure or sell marijuana items. Having these permits is necessary under Oregon law, however; permits are only valid for five years from the date issued by the OLCC. All permits under the commission grant an employee access to any licensed marijuana business in the state. Being a fairly regulated business, all budtenders are required by state law to have their worker permits readily available at any time while working, in case of immediate inspection by OLCC regulatory staff or enforcement officer. It is advised to keep the permit on one's self when working, for this immediate reason. If a budtender who possesses a legal permit were to be convicted by the state for misdemeanor or felony, they have 10 days to submit a written notification to the Commission. No permit is transferable; the permit to sell recreational marijuana belongs to the permittee. The only applicable license type that allows the sale of marijuana items to a consumer is the retail license. Every retailer must verify the age of every customer, for any and all purchases, and can only sell between the hours of 7am-10pm. A budtender cannot offer free samples to customers, give free marijuana items, or provide any form of discount if the sale is inline with the sale of other items. Retailers may only receive marijuana products from the OLCC licensed producers, processors, and wholesalers.

Massachusetts

In Massachusetts, the 2016 ballot petition known as “Question 4” became Chapter 334 of the Acts of 2016.  It created General Laws Chapter 94G which governs the adult use of marijuana and creates the Cannabis Control Commission (Commission). Chapter 334 and G.L. c.94G was amended by Chapter 55 of the Acts of 2017. These laws are herein referred to as The 2017 Act, unless otherwise noted.

The mission of the Cannabis Control Commission is to honor the will of the voters of Massachusetts by safely, equitably and effectively implementing and administering the laws enabling access to medical and adult use marijuana in the Commonwealth.

The state set up the Cannabis Control Commission in 2017. Metrc was contracted the following year, charged with helping the state regulate the cultivation, tracking, transport, testing, and sale of medical and adult-use cannabis and to assist in the creation of what Massachusetts Governor Charlie Baker called the “safe, reliable, legal market.”

References

External links

Business terms
Cannabis industry
People in hospitality occupations